Bertrand Arthur William Russell, 3rd Earl Russell,  (18 May 1872 – 2 February 1970) was a British mathematician, philosopher, logician, and public intellectual. He had a considerable influence on mathematics, logic, set theory, linguistics, artificial intelligence, cognitive science, computer science and various areas of analytic philosophy, especially philosophy of mathematics, philosophy of language, epistemology, and metaphysics.

He was one of the early 20th century's most prominent logicians, and a founder of analytic philosophy, along with his predecessor Gottlob Frege, his friend and colleague G. E. Moore and his student and protégé Ludwig Wittgenstein. Russell with Moore led the British "revolt against idealism". Together with his former teacher A. N. Whitehead, Russell wrote Principia Mathematica, a milestone in the development of classical logic, and a major attempt to reduce the whole of mathematics to logic (see Logicism). Russell's article "On Denoting" has been considered a "paradigm of philosophy".

Russell was a pacifist who championed anti-imperialism and chaired the India League. He occasionally advocated preventive nuclear war, before the opportunity provided by the atomic monopoly had passed and he decided he would "welcome with enthusiasm" world government. He went to prison for his pacifism during World War I. Later, Russell concluded that the war against Adolf Hitler's Nazi Germany was a necessary "lesser of two evils" and also criticized Stalinist totalitarianism, condemned the United States' involvement in the Vietnam War and was an outspoken proponent of nuclear disarmament. In 1950, Russell was awarded the Nobel Prize in Literature "in recognition of his varied and significant writings in which he champions humanitarian ideals and freedom of thought". He was also the recipient of the De Morgan Medal (1932), Sylvester Medal (1934), Kalinga Prize (1957), and Jerusalem Prize (1963).

Biography

Early life and background
Bertrand Arthur William Russell was born at Ravenscroft, Trellech, Monmouthshire, United Kingdom, on 18 May 1872, into an influential and liberal family of the British aristocracy. His parents, Viscount and Viscountess Amberley, were radical for their times. Lord Amberley consented to his wife's affair with their children's tutor, the biologist Douglas Spalding. Both were early advocates of birth control at a time when this was considered scandalous. Lord Amberley was a deist, and even asked the philosopher John Stuart Mill to act as Russell's secular godfather. Mill died the year after Russell's birth, but his writings had a great effect on Russell's life.

His paternal grandfather, Lord John Russell, later 1st Earl Russell (1792–1878), had twice been prime minister in the 1840s and 1860s. A member of Parliament since the early 1810s, he met with Napoleon Bonaparte in Elba. The Russells had been prominent in England for several centuries before this, coming to power and the peerage with the rise of the Tudor dynasty (see: Duke of Bedford). They established themselves as one of the leading Whig families and participated in every great political event from the dissolution of the monasteries in 1536–1540 to the Glorious Revolution in 1688–1689 and the Great Reform Act in 1832.

Lady Amberley was the daughter of Lord and Lady Stanley of Alderley. Russell often feared the ridicule of his maternal grandmother, one of the campaigners for education of women.

Childhood and adolescence
Russell had two siblings: brother Frank (nearly seven years older than Bertrand), and sister Rachel (four years older). In June 1874, Russell's mother died of diphtheria, followed shortly by Rachel's death. In January 1876, his father died of bronchitis after a long period of depression. Frank and Bertrand were placed in the care of staunchly Victorian paternal grandparents, who lived at Pembroke Lodge in Richmond Park. His grandfather, former Prime Minister Earl Russell, died in 1878, and was remembered by Russell as a kindly old man in a wheelchair. His grandmother, the Countess Russell (née Lady Frances Elliot), was the dominant family figure for the rest of Russell's childhood and youth.

The Countess was from a Scottish Presbyterian family and successfully petitioned the Court of Chancery to set aside a provision in Amberley's will requiring the children to be raised as agnostics. Despite her religious conservatism, she held progressive views in other areas (accepting Darwinism and supporting Irish Home Rule), and her influence on Bertrand Russell's outlook on social justice and standing up for principle remained with him throughout his life. Her favourite Bible verse, "Thou shalt not follow a multitude to do evil", became his motto. The atmosphere at Pembroke Lodge was one of frequent prayer, emotional repression and formality; Frank reacted to this with open rebellion, but the young Bertrand learned to hide his feelings.

Russell's adolescence was lonely and he often contemplated suicide. He remarked in his autobiography that his keenest interests in "nature and books and (later) mathematics saved me from complete despondency;" only his wish to know more mathematics kept him from suicide. He was educated at home by a series of tutors. When Russell was eleven years old, his brother Frank introduced him to the work of Euclid, which he described in his autobiography as "one of the great events of my life, as dazzling as first love".

During these formative years he also discovered the works of Percy Bysshe Shelley. Russell wrote: "I spent all my spare time reading him, and learning him by heart, knowing no one to whom I could speak of what I thought or felt, I used to reflect how wonderful it would have been to know Shelley, and to wonder whether I should meet any live human being with whom I should feel so much sympathy." Russell claimed that beginning at age 15, he spent considerable time thinking about the validity of Christian religious dogma, which he found unconvincing. At this age, he came to the conclusion that there is no free will and, two years later, that there is no life after death. Finally, at the age of 18, after reading Mill's Autobiography, he abandoned the "First Cause" argument and became an atheist.

He travelled to the continent in 1890 with an American friend, Edward FitzGerald, and with FitzGerald's family he visited the Paris Exhibition of 1889 and climbed the Eiffel Tower soon after it was completed.

University and first marriage

Russell won a scholarship to read for the Mathematical Tripos at Trinity College, Cambridge, and began his studies there in 1890, taking as coach Robert Rumsey Webb. He became acquainted with the younger George Edward Moore and came under the influence of Alfred North Whitehead, who recommended him to the Cambridge Apostles. He quickly distinguished himself in mathematics and philosophy, graduating as seventh Wrangler in the former in 1893 and becoming a Fellow in the latter in 1895.

Russell was 17 years old in the summer of 1889 when he met the family of Alys Pearsall Smith, an American Quaker five years older, who was a graduate of Bryn Mawr College near Philadelphia. He became a friend of the Pearsall Smith family. They knew him primarily as "Lord John's grandson" and enjoyed showing him off.

He soon fell in love with the puritanical, high-minded Alys, and contrary to his grandmother's wishes, married her on 13 December 1894. Their marriage began to fall apart in 1901 when it occurred to Russell, while cycling, that he no longer loved her. She asked him if he loved her and he replied that he did not. Russell also disliked Alys's mother, finding her controlling and cruel. A lengthy period of separation began in 1911 with Russell's affair with Lady Ottoline Morrell, and he and Alys finally divorced in 1921 to enable Russell to remarry.

During his years of separation from Alys, Russell had passionate (and often simultaneous) affairs with a number of women, including Morrell and the actress Lady Constance Malleson. Some have suggested that at this point he had an affair with Vivienne Haigh-Wood, the English governess and writer, and first wife of T. S. Eliot.

Early career

Russell began his published work in 1896 with German Social Democracy, a study in politics that was an early indication of a lifelong interest in political and social theory. In 1896 he taught German social democracy at the London School of Economics. He was a member of the Coefficients dining club of social reformers set up in 1902 by the Fabian campaigners Sidney and Beatrice Webb.

He now started an intensive study of the foundations of mathematics at Trinity. In 1897, he wrote An Essay on the Foundations of Geometry (submitted at the Fellowship Examination of Trinity College) which discussed the Cayley–Klein metrics used for non-Euclidean geometry. He attended the First International Congress of Philosophy in Paris in 1900 where he met Giuseppe Peano and Alessandro Padoa. The Italians had responded to Georg Cantor, making a science of set theory; they gave Russell their literature including the Formulario mathematico. Russell was impressed by the precision of Peano's arguments at the Congress, read the literature upon returning to England, and came upon Russell's paradox. In 1903 he published The Principles of Mathematics, a work on foundations of mathematics. It advanced a thesis of logicism, that mathematics and logic are one and the same.

At the age of 29, in February 1901, Russell underwent what he called a "sort of mystic illumination", after witnessing Whitehead's wife's acute suffering in an angina attack. "I found myself filled with semi-mystical feelings about beauty... and with a desire almost as profound as that of the Buddha to find some philosophy which should make human life endurable", Russell would later recall. "At the end of those five minutes, I had become a completely different person."

In 1905, he wrote the essay "On Denoting", which was published in the philosophical journal Mind. Russell was elected a Fellow of the Royal Society (FRS) in 1908. The three-volume Principia Mathematica, written with Whitehead, was published between 1910 and 1913. This, along with the earlier The Principles of Mathematics, soon made Russell world-famous in his field.

In 1910, he became a University of Cambridge lecturer at Trinity College, where he had studied. He was considered for a Fellowship, which would give him a vote in the college government and protect him from being fired for his opinions, but was passed over because he was "anti-clerical", essentially because he was agnostic. He was approached by the Austrian engineering student Ludwig Wittgenstein, who became his PhD student. Russell viewed Wittgenstein as a genius and a successor who would continue his work on logic. He spent hours dealing with Wittgenstein's various phobias and his frequent bouts of despair. This was often a drain on Russell's energy, but Russell continued to be fascinated by him and encouraged his academic development, including the publication of Wittgenstein's Tractatus Logico-Philosophicus in 1922. Russell delivered his lectures on logical atomism, his version of these ideas, in 1918, before the end of World War I. Wittgenstein was, at that time, serving in the Austrian Army and subsequently spent nine months in an Italian prisoner of war camp at the end of the conflict.

First World War

During World War I, Russell was one of the few people to engage in active pacifist activities. In 1916, because of his lack of a Fellowship, he was dismissed from Trinity College following his conviction under the Defence of the Realm Act 1914. He later described this, in Free Thought and Official Propaganda, as an illegitimate means the state used to violate freedom of expression. Russell championed the case of Eric Chappelow, a poet jailed and abused as a conscientious objector. Russell played a significant part in the Leeds Convention in June 1917, a historic event which saw well over a thousand "anti-war socialists" gather; many being delegates from the Independent Labour Party and the Socialist Party, united in their pacifist beliefs and advocating a peace settlement. The international press reported that Russell appeared with a number of Labour Members of Parliament (MPs), including Ramsay MacDonald and Philip Snowden, as well as former Liberal MP and anti-conscription campaigner, Professor Arnold Lupton. After the event, Russell told Lady Ottoline Morrell that, "to my surprise, when I got up to speak, I was given the greatest ovation that was possible to give anybody".

His conviction in 1916 resulted in Russell being fined £100, which he refused to pay in hope that he would be sent to prison, but his books were sold at auction to raise the money. The books were bought by friends; he later treasured his copy of the King James Bible that was stamped "Confiscated by Cambridge Police".

A later conviction for publicly lecturing against inviting the United States to enter the war on the United Kingdom's side resulted in six months' imprisonment in Brixton Prison (see Bertrand Russell's political views) in 1918. He later said of his imprisonment:

While he was reading Strachey's Eminent Victorians chapter about Gordon he laughed out loud in his cell prompting the warder to intervene and reminding him that "prison was a place of punishment".

Russell was reinstated to Trinity in 1919, resigned in 1920, was Tarner Lecturer in 1926 and became a Fellow again in 1944 until 1949.

In 1924, Russell again gained press attention when attending a "banquet" in the House of Commons with well-known campaigners, including Arnold Lupton, who had been an MP and had also endured imprisonment for "passive resistance to military or naval service".

G. H. Hardy on the Trinity controversy
In 1941, G. H. Hardy wrote a 61-page pamphlet titled Bertrand Russell and Trinity – published later as a book by Cambridge University Press with a foreword by C. D. Broad—in which he gave an authoritative account of Russell's 1916 dismissal from Trinity College, explaining that a reconciliation between the college and Russell had later taken place and gave details about Russell's personal life. Hardy writes that Russell's dismissal had created a scandal since the vast majority of the Fellows of the College opposed the decision. The ensuing pressure from the Fellows induced the Council to reinstate Russell. In January 1920, it was announced that Russell had accepted the reinstatement offer from Trinity and would begin lecturing from October. In July 1920, Russell applied for a one year leave of absence; this was approved. He spent the year giving lectures in China and Japan. In January 1921, it was announced by Trinity that Russell had resigned and his resignation had been accepted. This resignation, Hardy explains, was completely voluntary and was not the result of another altercation.

The reason for the resignation, according to Hardy, was that Russell was going through a tumultuous time in his personal life with a divorce and subsequent remarriage. Russell contemplated asking Trinity for another one-year leave of absence but decided against it, since this would have been an "unusual application" and the situation had the potential to snowball into another controversy. Although Russell did the right thing, in Hardy's opinion, the reputation of the College suffered with Russell's resignation, since the 'world of learning' knew about Russell's altercation with Trinity but not that the rift had healed. In 1925, Russell was asked by the Council of Trinity College to give the Tarner Lectures on the Philosophy of the Sciences; these would later be the basis for one of Russell's best-received books according to Hardy: The Analysis of Matter, published in 1927. In the preface to the Trinity pamphlet, Hardy wrote:

Between the wars
In August 1920, Russell travelled to Soviet Russia as part of an official delegation sent by the British government to investigate the effects of the Russian Revolution. He wrote a four-part series of articles, titled "Soviet Russia—1920", for the magazine The Nation. He met Vladimir Lenin and had an hour-long conversation with him. In his autobiography, he mentions that he found Lenin disappointing, sensing an "impish cruelty" in him and comparing him to "an opinionated professor". He cruised down the Volga on a steamship. His experiences destroyed his previous tentative support for the revolution. He subsequently wrote a book, The Practice and Theory of Bolshevism, about his experiences on this trip, taken with a group of 24 others from the UK, all of whom came home thinking well of the Soviet regime, despite Russell's attempts to change their minds. For example, he told them that he had heard shots fired in the middle of the night and was sure that these were clandestine executions, but the others maintained that it was only cars backfiring.

Russell's lover Dora Black, a British author, feminist and socialist campaigner, visited Soviet Russia independently at the same time; in contrast to his reaction, she was enthusiastic about the Bolshevik revolution.

The following year, Russell, accompanied by Dora, visited Peking (as Beijing was then known outside of China) to lecture on philosophy for a year. He went with optimism and hope, seeing China as then being on a new path. Other scholars present in China at the time included John Dewey and Rabindranath Tagore, the Indian Nobel-laureate poet. Before leaving China, Russell became gravely ill with pneumonia, and incorrect reports of his death were published in the Japanese press. When the couple visited Japan on their return journey, Dora took on the role of spurning the local press by handing out notices reading "Mr. Bertrand Russell, having died according to the Japanese press, is unable to give interviews to Japanese journalists". Apparently they found this harsh and reacted resentfully.

Dora was six months pregnant when the couple returned to England on 26 August 1921. Russell arranged a hasty divorce from Alys, marrying Dora six days after the divorce was finalised, on 27 September 1921. Russell's children with Dora were John Conrad Russell, 4th Earl Russell, born on 16 November 1921, and Katharine Jane Russell (now Lady Katharine Tait), born on 29 December 1923. Russell supported his family during this time by writing popular books explaining matters of physics, ethics, and education to the layman.

From 1922 to 1927 the Russells divided their time between London and Cornwall, spending summers in Porthcurno. In the 1922 and 1923 general elections Russell stood as a Labour Party candidate in the Chelsea constituency, but only on the basis that he knew he was extremely unlikely to be elected in such a safe Conservative seat, and he was unsuccessful on both occasions.

After the birth of his two children, he became interested in education, especially early childhood education. He was not satisfied with the old traditional education and thought that progressive education also had some flaws; as a result, together with Dora, Russell founded the experimental Beacon Hill School in 1927. The school was run from a succession of different locations, including its original premises at the Russells' residence, Telegraph House, near Harting, West Sussex. During this time, he published "On Education, Especially in Early Childhood". On 8 July 1930 Dora gave birth to her third child Harriet Ruth. After he left the school in 1932, Dora continued it until 1943.

In 1927 Russell met Barry Fox (later Barry Stevens), who became a well-known Gestalt therapist and writer in later years. They developed an intensive relationship, and in Fox's words: "...for three years we were very close." Fox sent her daughter Judith to Beacon Hill School. From 1927 to 1932 Russell wrote 34 letters to Fox. Upon the death of his elder brother Frank, in 1931, Russell became the 3rd Earl Russell.

Russell's marriage to Dora grew increasingly tenuous, and it reached a breaking point over her having two children with an American journalist, Griffin Barry. They separated in 1932 and finally divorced. On 18 January 1936, Russell married his third wife, an Oxford undergraduate named Patricia ("Peter") Spence, who had been his children's governess since 1930. Russell and Peter had one son, Conrad Sebastian Robert Russell, 5th Earl Russell, who became a prominent historian and one of the leading figures in the Liberal Democrat party.

Russell returned in 1937 to the London School of Economics to lecture on the science of power. During the 1930's, Russell became a friend and collaborator of V. K. Krishna Menon, then President of the India League, the foremost lobby in the United Kingdom for Indian independence. Russell chaired the India League from 1932 to 1939.

Second World War
Russell's political views changed over time, mostly about war. He opposed rearmament against Nazi Germany. In 1937, he wrote in a personal letter: "If the Germans succeed in sending an invading army to England we should do best to treat them as visitors, give them quarters and invite the commander and chief to dine with the prime minister." In 1940, he changed his appeasement view that avoiding a full-scale world war was more important than defeating Hitler. He concluded that Adolf Hitler taking over all of Europe would be a permanent threat to democracy. In 1943, he adopted a stance toward large-scale warfare called "relative political pacifism": "War was always a great evil, but in some particularly extreme circumstances, it may be the lesser of two evils."

Before World War II, Russell taught at the University of Chicago, later moving on to Los Angeles to lecture at the UCLA Department of Philosophy. He was appointed professor at the City College of New York (CCNY) in 1940, but after a public outcry the appointment was annulled by a court judgment that pronounced him "morally unfit" to teach at the college because of his opinions, especially those relating to sexual morality, detailed in Marriage and Morals (1929). The matter was however taken to the New York Supreme Court by Jean Kay who was afraid that her daughter would be harmed by the appointment, though her daughter was not a student at CCNY. Many intellectuals, led by John Dewey, protested at his treatment. Albert Einstein's oft-quoted aphorism that "great spirits have always encountered violent opposition from mediocre minds" originated in his open letter, dated 19 March 1940, to Morris Raphael Cohen, a professor emeritus at CCNY, supporting Russell's appointment. Dewey and Horace M. Kallen edited a collection of articles on the CCNY affair in The Bertrand Russell Case. Russell soon joined the Barnes Foundation, lecturing to a varied audience on the history of philosophy; these lectures formed the basis of A History of Western Philosophy. His relationship with the eccentric Albert C. Barnes soon soured, and he returned to the UK in 1944 to rejoin the faculty of Trinity College.

Later life

Russell participated in many broadcasts over the BBC, particularly The Brains Trust and for the Third Programme, on various topical and philosophical subjects. By this time Russell was world-famous outside academic circles, frequently the subject or author of magazine and newspaper articles, and was called upon to offer opinions on a wide variety of subjects, even mundane ones. En route to one of his lectures in Trondheim, Russell was one of 24 survivors (among a total of 43 passengers) of an aeroplane crash in Hommelvik in October 1948. He said he owed his life to smoking since the people who drowned were in the non-smoking part of the plane. A History of Western Philosophy (1945) became a best-seller and provided Russell with a steady income for the remainder of his life.

In 1942, Russell argued in favour of a moderate socialism, capable of overcoming its metaphysical principles. In an inquiry on dialectical materialism, launched by the Austrian artist and philosopher Wolfgang Paalen in his journal DYN, Russell said: "I think the metaphysics of both Hegel and Marx plain nonsense—Marx's claim to be 'science' is no more justified than Mary Baker Eddy's. This does not mean that I am opposed to socialism."

In 1943, Russell expressed support for Zionism: "I have come gradually to see that, in a dangerous and largely hostile world, it is essential to Jews to have some country which is theirs, some region where they are not suspected aliens, some state which embodies what is distinctive in their culture".

In a speech in 1948, Russell said that if the USSR's aggression continued, it would be morally worse to go to war after the USSR possessed an atomic bomb than before it possessed one, because if the USSR had no bomb the West's victory would come more swiftly and with fewer casualties than if there were atomic bombs on both sides. At that time, only the United States possessed an atomic bomb, and the USSR was pursuing an extremely aggressive policy towards the countries in Eastern Europe which were being absorbed into the Soviet Union's sphere of influence. Many understood Russell's comments to mean that Russell approved of a first strike in a war with the USSR, including Nigel Lawson, who was present when Russell spoke of such matters. Others, including Griffin, who obtained a transcript of the speech, have argued that he was merely explaining the usefulness of America's atomic arsenal in deterring the USSR from continuing its domination of Eastern Europe.

Just after the atomic bombs exploded over Hiroshima and Nagasaki, Russell wrote letters, and published articles in newspapers from 1945 to 1948, stating clearly that it was morally justified and better to go to war against the USSR using atomic bombs while the United States possessed them and before the USSR did. In September 1949, one week after the USSR tested its first A-bomb, but before this became known, Russell wrote that USSR would be unable to develop nuclear weapons because following Stalin's purges only science based on Marxist principles would be practised in the Soviet Union. After it became known that the USSR had carried out its nuclear bomb tests, Russell declared his position advocating the total abolition of atomic weapons.

In 1948, Russell was invited by the BBC to deliver the inaugural Reith Lectures—what was to become an annual series of lectures, still broadcast by the BBC. His series of six broadcasts, titled Authority and the Individual, explored themes such as the role of individual initiative in the development of a community and the role of state control in a progressive society. Russell continued to write about philosophy. He wrote a foreword to Words and Things by Ernest Gellner, which was highly critical of the later thought of Ludwig Wittgenstein and of ordinary language philosophy. Gilbert Ryle refused to have the book reviewed in the philosophical journal Mind, which caused Russell to respond via The Times. The result was a month-long correspondence in The Times between the supporters and detractors of ordinary language philosophy, which was only ended when the paper published an editorial critical of both sides but agreeing with the opponents of ordinary language philosophy.

In the King's Birthday Honours of 9 June 1949, Russell was awarded the Order of Merit, and the following year he was awarded the Nobel Prize in Literature. When he was given the Order of Merit, George VI was affable but slightly embarrassed at decorating a former jailbird, saying, "You have sometimes behaved in a manner that would not do if generally adopted". Russell merely smiled, but afterwards claimed that the reply "That's right, just like your brother" immediately came to mind.

In 1950, Russell attended the inaugural conference for the Congress for Cultural Freedom, a CIA-funded anti-communist organisation committed to the deployment of culture as a weapon during the Cold War. Russell was one of the best-known patrons of the Congress, until he resigned in 1956.

In 1952, Russell was divorced by Spence, with whom he had been very unhappy. Conrad, Russell's son by Spence, did not see his father between the time of the divorce and 1968 (at which time his decision to meet his father caused a permanent breach with his mother). Russell married his fourth wife, Edith Finch, soon after the divorce, on 15 December 1952. They had known each other since 1925, and Edith had taught English at Bryn Mawr College near Philadelphia, sharing a house for 20 years with Russell's old friend Lucy Donnelly. Edith remained with him until his death, and, by all accounts, their marriage was a happy, close, and loving one. Russell's eldest son John suffered from serious mental illness, which was the source of ongoing disputes between Russell and his former wife Dora.

In September 1961, at the age of 89, Russell was jailed for seven days in Brixton Prison for a "breach of the peace" after taking part in an anti-nuclear demonstration in London. The magistrate offered to exempt him from jail if he pledged himself to "good behaviour", to which Russell replied: "No, I won't."

In 1962 Russell played a public role in the Cuban Missile Crisis: in an exchange of telegrams with Soviet leader Nikita Khrushchev, Khrushchev assured him that the Soviet government would not be reckless. Russell sent this telegram to President Kennedy:
YOUR ACTION DESPERATE. THREAT TO HUMAN SURVIVAL. NO CONCEIVABLE JUSTIFICATION. CIVILIZED MAN CONDEMNS IT. WE WILL NOT HAVE MASS MURDER. ULTIMATUM MEANS WAR... END THIS MADNESS.

According to historian Peter Knight, after JFK's assassination, Russell, "prompted by the emerging work of the lawyer Mark Lane in the US ... rallied support from other noteworthy and left-leaning compatriots to form a Who Killed Kennedy Committee in June 1964, members of which included Michael Foot MP, Caroline Benn, the publisher Victor Gollancz, the writers John Arden and J. B. Priestley, and the Oxford history professor Hugh Trevor-Roper." Russell published a highly critical article weeks before the Warren Commission Report was published, setting forth 16 Questions on the Assassination and equating the Oswald case with the Dreyfus affair of late 19th-century France, in which the state convicted an innocent man. Russell also criticised the American press for failing to heed any voices critical of the official version.

Political causes
Bertrand Russell was opposed to war from a young age; his opposition to World War I being used as grounds for his dismissal from Trinity College at Cambridge. This incident fused two of his most controversial causes, as he had failed to be granted Fellow status which would have protected him from firing, because he was not willing to either pretend to be a devout Christian, or at least avoid admitting he was agnostic.

He later described the resolution of these issues as essential to freedom of thought and expression, citing the incident in Free Thought and Official Propaganda, where he explained that the expression of any idea, even the most obviously "bad", must be protected not only from direct State intervention, but also economic leveraging and other means of being silenced:

Russell spent the 1950s and 1960s engaged in political causes primarily related to nuclear disarmament and opposing the Vietnam War. The 1955 Russell–Einstein Manifesto was a document calling for nuclear disarmament and was signed by eleven of the most prominent nuclear physicists and intellectuals of the time. In 1966–1967, Russell worked with Jean-Paul Sartre and many other intellectual figures to form the Russell Vietnam War Crimes Tribunal to investigate the conduct of the United States in Vietnam. He wrote a great many letters to world leaders during this period.

Early in his life Russell supported eugenicist policies. He proposed in 1894 that the state issue certificates of health to prospective parents and withhold public benefits from those considered unfit. In 1929 he wrote that people deemed "mentally defective" and "feebleminded" should be sexually sterilized because they "are apt to have enormous numbers of illegitimate children, all, as a rule, wholly useless to the community." Russell was also an advocate of population control:The nations which at present increase rapidly should be encouraged to adopt the methods by which, in the West, the increase of population has been checked. Educational propaganda, with government help, could achieve this result in a generation. There are, however, two powerful forces opposed to such a policy: one is religion, the other is nationalism. I think it is the duty of all to proclaim that opposition to the spread of birth is appalling depth of misery and degradation, and that within another fifty years or so. I do not pretend that birth control is the only way in which population can be kept from increasing. There are others, which, one must suppose, opponents of birth control would prefer. War, as I remarked a moment ago, has hitherto been disappointing in this respect, but perhaps bacteriological war may prove more effective. If a Black Death could be spread throughout the whole world once in every generation survivors could procreate freely without making the world too full.

On 20 November 1948, in a public speech at Westminster School, addressing a gathering arranged by the New Commonwealth, Russell shocked some observers by suggesting that a preemptive nuclear strike on the Soviet Union was justified. Russell argued that war between the United States and the Soviet Union seemed inevitable, so it would be a humanitarian gesture to get it over with quickly and have the United States in the dominant position. Currently, Russell argued, humanity could survive such a war, whereas a full nuclear war after both sides had manufactured large stockpiles of more destructive weapons was likely to result in the extinction of the human race. Russell later relented from this stance, instead arguing for mutual disarmament by the nuclear powers.

In 1956, immediately before and during the Suez Crisis, Russell expressed his opposition to European imperialism in the Middle East. He viewed the crisis as another reminder of the pressing need for a more effective mechanism for international governance, and to restrict national sovereignty to places such as the Suez Canal area "where general interest is involved". At the same time the Suez Crisis was taking place, the world was also captivated by the Hungarian Revolution and the subsequent crushing of the revolt by intervening Soviet forces. Russell attracted criticism for speaking out fervently against the Suez war while ignoring Soviet repression in Hungary, to which he responded that he did not criticise the Soviets "because there was no need. Most of the so-called Western World was fulminating". Although he later feigned a lack of concern, at the time he was disgusted by the brutal Soviet response, and on 16 November 1956, he expressed approval for a declaration of support for Hungarian scholars which Michael Polanyi had cabled to the Soviet embassy in London twelve days previously, shortly after Soviet troops had entered Budapest.

In November 1957 Russell wrote an article addressing US President Dwight D. Eisenhower and Soviet Premier Nikita Khrushchev, urging a summit to consider "the conditions of co-existence". Khrushchev responded that peace could be served by such a meeting. In January 1958 Russell elaborated his views in The Observer, proposing a cessation of all nuclear weapons production, with the UK taking the first step by unilaterally suspending its own nuclear-weapons program if necessary, and with Germany "freed from all alien armed forces and pledged to neutrality in any conflict between East and West". US Secretary of State John Foster Dulles replied for Eisenhower. The exchange of letters was published as The Vital Letters of Russell, Khrushchev, and Dulles.

Russell was asked by The New Republic, a liberal American magazine, to elaborate his views on world peace. He urged that all nuclear weapons testing and flights by planes armed with nuclear weapons be halted immediately, and negotiations be opened for the destruction of all hydrogen bombs, with the number of conventional nuclear devices limited to ensure a balance of power. He proposed that Germany be reunified and accept the Oder-Neisse line as its border, and that a neutral zone be established in Central Europe, consisting at the minimum of Germany, Poland, Hungary, and Czechoslovakia, with each of these countries being free of foreign troops and influence, and prohibited from forming alliances with countries outside the zone. In the Middle East, Russell suggested that the West avoid opposing Arab nationalism, and proposed the creation of a United Nations peacekeeping force to guard Israel's frontiers to ensure that Israel was prevented from committing aggression and protected from it. He also suggested Western recognition of the People's Republic of China, and that it be admitted to the UN with a permanent seat on the UN Security Council.

He was in contact with Lionel Rogosin while the latter was filming his anti-war film Good Times, Wonderful Times in the 1960s. He became a hero to many of the youthful members of the New Left. In early 1963, Russell became increasingly vocal in his disapproval of the Vietnam War, and felt that the US government's policies there were near-genocidal. In 1963 he became the inaugural recipient of the Jerusalem Prize, an award for writers concerned with the freedom of the individual in society. In 1964 he was one of eleven world figures who issued an appeal to Israel and the Arab countries to accept an arms embargo and international supervision of nuclear plants and rocket weaponry. In October 1965 he tore up his Labour Party card because he suspected Harold Wilson's Labour government was going to send troops to support the United States in Vietnam.

Final years, death and legacy

In June 1955, Russell had leased Plas Penrhyn in Penrhyndeudraeth, Merionethshire, Wales and on 5 July of the following year it became his and Edith's principal residence.

Russell published his three-volume autobiography in 1967, 1968, and 1969. He made a cameo appearance playing himself in the anti-war Hindi film Aman, by Mohan Kumar, which was released in India in 1967. This was Russell's only appearance in a feature film.

On 23 November 1969, he wrote to The Times newspaper saying that the preparation for show trials in Czechoslovakia was "highly alarming". The same month, he appealed to Secretary General U Thant of the United Nations to support an international war crimes commission to investigate alleged torture and genocide by the United States in South Vietnam during the Vietnam War. The following month, he protested to Alexei Kosygin over the expulsion of Aleksandr Solzhenitsyn from the Soviet Union of Writers.

On 31 January 1970, Russell issued a statement condemning "Israel's aggression in the Middle East", and in particular, Israeli bombing raids being carried out deep in Egyptian territory as part of the War of Attrition, which he compared to German bombing raids in the Battle of Britain and the US bombing of Vietnam. He called for an Israeli withdrawal to the pre-Six-Day War borders. This was Russell's final political statement or act. It was read out at the International Conference of Parliamentarians in Cairo on 3 February 1970, the day after his death.

Russell died of influenza, just after 8 pm on 2 February 1970 at his home in Penrhyndeudraeth. His body was cremated in Colwyn Bay on 5 February 1970 with five people present. In accordance with his will, there was no religious ceremony but one minute's silence; his ashes were later scattered over the Welsh mountains. Although he was born in Monmouthshire, and died in Penrhyndeudraeth in Wales, Russell identified as English. Later in 1970, on 23 October, his will was published showing he'd left an estate valued at £69,423 (equivalent to £ million in ). In 1980, a memorial to Russell was commissioned by a committee including the philosopher A. J. Ayer. It consists of a bust of Russell in Red Lion Square in London sculpted by Marcelle Quinton.

Lady Katharine Jane Tait, Russell's daughter, founded the Bertrand Russell Society in 1974 to preserve and understand his work. It publishes the Bertrand Russell Society Bulletin, holds meetings and awards prizes for scholarship, including the Bertrand Russell Society Award. She also authored several essays about her father; as well as a book, My Father, Bertrand Russell, which was published in 1975. All members receive Russell: The Journal of Bertrand Russell Studies.

For the sesquicentennial of his birth, in May 2022, McMaster University's Bertrand Russell Archive, the university’s largest and most heavily used research collection, organized both a physical and virtual exhibition on  Russell’s anti-nuclear stance in the post-war era, Scientists for Peace: the Russell-Einstein Manifesto and the Pugwash Conference, which included the earliest version of the Russell–Einstein Manifesto. The Bertrand Russell Peace Foundation held a commemoration at Conway Hall in Red Lion Square, London, on 18 May, the anniversary of his birth. For its part, on the same day, La Estrella de Panamá published a biographical sketch by Francisco Díaz Montilla, who commented that "[if he] had to characterize Russell's work in one sentence [he] would say: criticism and rejection of dogmatism."

Bangladesh's first leader, Mujibur Rahman, named his youngest son Sheikh Russel in honour of Bertrand Russell.

Marriages and issue
Russell first married Alys Whitall Smith (died 1951) in 1894. The marriage was dissolved in 1921 with no issue. His second marriage was to Dora Winifred Black MBE (died 1986), daughter of Sir Frederick Black, in 1921. This was dissolved in 1935, having produced two children: 
John Conrad Russell, 4th Earl Russell (1921–1987)
Lady Katharine Jane Russell (1923–2021), who married Rev. Charles Tait in 1948 and had issue
Russell's third marriage was to Patricia Helen Spence (died 2004) in 1936, with the marriage producing one child:
Conrad Sebastian Robert Russell, 5th Earl Russell (1937–2004)
Russell's third marriage ended in divorce in 1952. He married Edith Finch in the same year. Finch survived Russell, dying in 1978.

Titles and honours from birth
Russell held throughout his life the following styles and honours:
from birth until 1908: The Honourable Bertrand Arthur William Russell
from 1908 until 1931: The Honourable Bertrand Arthur William Russell, FRS
from 1931 until 1949: The Right Honourable The Earl Russell, FRS
from 1949 until death: The Right Honourable The Earl Russell, OM, FRS

Views

Philosophy

Russell is generally credited with being one of the founders of analytic philosophy. He was deeply impressed by Gottfried Leibniz (1646–1716), and wrote on every major area of philosophy except aesthetics. He was particularly prolific in the fields of metaphysics, logic and the philosophy of mathematics, the philosophy of language, ethics and epistemology. When Brand Blanshard asked Russell why he did not write on aesthetics, Russell replied that he did not know anything about it, though he hastened to add "but that is not a very good excuse, for my friends tell me it has not deterred me from writing on other subjects".

On ethics, Russell wrote that he was a utilitarian in his youth, yet he later distanced himself from this view.

For the advancement of science and protection of liberty of expression, Russell advocated The Will to Doubt, the recognition that all human knowledge is at most a best guess, that one should always remember:

Religion
Russell described himself in 1947 as an agnostic or an atheist: he found it difficult to determine which term to adopt, saying: For most of his adult life, Russell maintained religion to be little more than superstition and, despite any positive effects, largely harmful to people. He believed that religion and the religious outlook serve to impede knowledge and foster fear and dependency, and to be responsible for much of our world's wars, oppression, and misery. He was a member of the Advisory Council of the British Humanist Association and President of Cardiff Humanists until his death.

Society

Political and social activism occupied much of Russell's time for most of his life. Russell remained politically active almost to the end of his life, writing to and exhorting world leaders and lending his name to various causes.

Russell argued for a "scientific society", where war would be abolished, population growth would be limited, and prosperity would be shared. He suggested the establishment of a "single supreme world government" able to enforce peace, claiming that "the only thing that will redeem mankind is co-operation". Russell also expressed support for guild socialism, and commented positively on several socialist thinkers and activists.

Russell was an active supporter of the Homosexual Law Reform Society, being one of the signatories of A. E. Dyson's 1958 letter to The Times calling for a change in the law regarding male homosexual practices, which were partly legalised in 1967, when Russell was still alive.

Russell advocated – and was one of the first people in the UK to suggest – a universal basic income.

In "Reflections on My Eightieth Birthday" ("Postscript" in his Autobiography), Russell wrote: "I have lived in the pursuit of a vision, both personal and social. Personal: to care for what is noble, for what is beautiful, for what is gentle; to allow moments of insight to give wisdom at more mundane times. Social: to see in imagination the society that is to be created, where individuals grow freely, and where hate and greed and envy die because there is nothing to nourish them. These things I believe, and the world, for all its horrors, has left me unshaken".

Freedom of opinion and expression
Russell was a champion of freedom of opinion and an opponent of both censorship and indoctrination. In 1928, he wrote: "The fundamental argument for freedom of opinion is the doubtfulness of all our belief... when the State intervenes to ensure the indoctrination of some doctrine, it does so because there is no conclusive evidence in favour of that doctrine ... It is clear that thought is not free if the profession of certain opinions make it impossible to make a living". In 1957, he wrote: "'Free thought' means thinking freely ... to be worthy of the name freethinker he must be free of two things: the force of tradition and the tyranny of his own passions."

Education
Russell has presented ideas on the possible means of control of education in case of scientific dictatorship governments, of the kind of this excerpt taken from chapter II "General Effects of Scientific Technique" of "The Impact of Science on society".

He pushed his visionary scenarios even further into details, in the chapter III "Scientific Technique in an Oligarchy" of the same book, stating as an example

Selected bibliography
Below is a selected bibliography of Russell's books in English, sorted by year of first publication:
1896. German Social Democracy. London: Longmans, Green
1897. An Essay on the Foundations of Geometry. Cambridge: Cambridge University Press
1900. A Critical Exposition of the Philosophy of Leibniz. Cambridge: Cambridge University Press
1903. The Principles of Mathematics. Cambridge University Press
1903. A Free man's worship, and other essays.
1905. On Denoting, Mind, Vol. 14. . Basil Blackwell
1910. Philosophical Essays. London: Longmans, Green
1910–1913. Principia Mathematica. (with Alfred North Whitehead). 3 vols. Cambridge: Cambridge University Press
1912. The Problems of Philosophy. London: Williams and Norgate
1914. Our Knowledge of the External World as a Field for Scientific Method in Philosophy. Chicago and London: Open Court Publishing.
1916. Principles of Social Reconstruction. London, George Allen and Unwin
1916. Why Men Fight. New York: The Century Co
1916. The Policy of the Entente, 1904–1914 : a reply to Professor Gilbert Murray. Manchester: The National Labour Press
1916. Justice in War-time. Chicago: Open Court
1917. Political Ideals. New York: The Century Co.
1918. Mysticism and Logic and Other Essays. London: George Allen & Unwin
1918. Proposed Roads to Freedom: Socialism, Anarchism, and Syndicalism. London: George Allen & Unwin
1919. Introduction to Mathematical Philosophy. London: George Allen & Unwin. ( for Routledge paperback)
1920. The Practice and Theory of Bolshevism. London: George Allen & Unwin
1921. The Analysis of Mind. London: George Allen & Unwin
1922. The Problem of China. London: George Allen & Unwin
1922. Free Thought and Official Propaganda, delivered at South Place Institute
1923. The Prospects of Industrial Civilization, in collaboration with Dora Russell. London: George Allen & Unwin
1923. The ABC of Atoms, London: Kegan Paul. Trench, Trubner
1924. Icarus; or, The Future of Science. London: Kegan Paul, Trench, Trubner
1925. The ABC of Relativity. London: Kegan Paul, Trench, Trubner
1925. What I Believe. London: Kegan Paul, Trench, Trubner
1926. On Education, Especially in Early Childhood. London: George Allen & Unwin
1927. The Analysis of Matter. London: Kegan Paul, Trench, Trubner
1927. An Outline of Philosophy. London: George Allen & Unwin
1927. Why I Am Not a Christian. London: Watts
1927. Selected Papers of Bertrand Russell. New York: Modern Library
1928. Sceptical Essays. London: George Allen & Unwin
1929. Marriage and Morals. London: George Allen & Unwin
1930. The Conquest of Happiness. London: George Allen & Unwin
1931. The Scientific Outlook, London: George Allen & Unwin
1932. Education and the Social Order, London: George Allen & Unwin
1934. Freedom and Organization, 1814–1914. London: George Allen & Unwin
1935. In Praise of Idleness and Other Essays. London: George Allen & Unwin
1935. Religion and Science. London: Thornton Butterworth
1936. Which Way to Peace?. London: Jonathan Cape
1937. The Amberley Papers: The Letters and Diaries of Lord and Lady Amberley, with Patricia Russell, 2 vols., London: Leonard & Virginia Woolf at the Hogarth Press; reprinted (1966) as The Amberley Papers. Bertrand Russell's Family Background, 2 vols., London: George Allen & Unwin
1938. Power: A New Social Analysis. London: George Allen & Unwin
1940. An Inquiry into Meaning and Truth. New York: W. W. Norton & Company.
1945. The Bomb and Civilisation. Published in the Glasgow Forward on 18 August 1945
1945. A History of Western Philosophy and Its Connection with Political and Social Circumstances from the Earliest Times to the Present Day New York: Simon and Schuster
1948. Human Knowledge: Its Scope and Limits. London: George Allen & Unwin
1949. Authority and the Individual. London: George Allen & Unwin
1950. . London: George Allen & Unwin
1951. New Hopes for a Changing World. London: George Allen & Unwin
1952. The Impact of Science on Society. London: George Allen & Unwin
1953. Satan in the Suburbs and Other Stories. London: George Allen & Unwin
1954. Human Society in Ethics and Politics. London: George Allen & Unwin
1954. Nightmares of Eminent Persons and Other Stories. London: George Allen & Unwin
1956. Portraits from Memory and Other Essays. London: George Allen & Unwin
1956. Logic and Knowledge: Essays 1901–1950, edited by Robert C. Marsh. London: George Allen & Unwin
1957. Why I Am Not A Christian and Other Essays on Religion and Related Subjects, edited by Paul Edwards. London: George Allen & Unwin
1958. Understanding History and Other Essays. New York: Philosophical Library
1958. The Will to Doubt. New York: Philosophical Library
1959. Common Sense and Nuclear Warfare. London: George Allen & Unwin
1959. My Philosophical Development. London: George Allen & Unwin
1959. Wisdom of the West: A Historical Survey of Western Philosophy in Its Social and Political Setting, edited by Paul Foulkes. London: Macdonald
1960. Bertrand Russell Speaks His Mind, Cleveland and New York: World Publishing Company
1961. The Basic Writings of Bertrand Russell, edited by R. E. Egner and L. E. Denonn. London: George Allen & Unwin
1961. Fact and Fiction. London: George Allen & Unwin
1961. Has Man a Future? London: George Allen & Unwin
1963. Essays in Skepticism. New York: Philosophical Library
1963. Unarmed Victory. London: George Allen & Unwin
1965. Legitimacy Versus Industrialism, 1814–1848. London: George Allen & Unwin (first published as Parts I and II of Freedom and Organization, 1814–1914, 1934)
1965. On the Philosophy of Science, edited by Charles A. Fritz, Jr. Indianapolis: The Bobbs–Merrill Company
1966. The ABC of Relativity. London: George Allen & Unwin
1967. Russell's Peace Appeals, edited by Tsutomu Makino and Kazuteru Hitaka. Japan: Eichosha's New Current Books
1967. War Crimes in Vietnam. London: George Allen & Unwin
1951–1969. The Autobiography of Bertrand Russell, 3 vols., London: George Allen & Unwin. Vol. 2, 1956
1969. Dear Bertrand Russell... A Selection of his Correspondence with the General Public 1950–1968, edited by Barry Feinberg and Ronald Kasrils. London: George Allen and Unwin

Russell was the author of more than sixty books and over two thousand articles. Additionally, he wrote many pamphlets, introductions, and letters to the editor. One pamphlet titled, I Appeal unto Caesar': The Case of the Conscientious Objectors, ghostwritten for Margaret Hobhouse, the mother of imprisoned peace activist Stephen Hobhouse, allegedly helped secure the release from prison of hundreds of conscientious objectors.

His works can be found in anthologies and collections, including The Collected Papers of Bertrand Russell, which McMaster University began publishing in 1983. By March 2017 this collection of his shorter and previously unpublished works included 18 volumes, and several more are in progress. A bibliography in three additional volumes catalogues his publications. The Russell Archives held by McMaster's William Ready Division of Archives and Research Collections possess over 40,000 of his letters.

See also

Cambridge University Moral Sciences Club
Criticism of Jesus
Joseph Conrad (Russell's impression)
List of peace activists
List of pioneers in computer science
Information Research Department
Type theory
Type system
Logicomix, a graphic novel about the foundational quest in mathematics, the narrator of the story being Bertrand Russell and with his life as the main storyline

Notes

References

Citations

Sources
Primary sources
1900, Sur la logique des relations avec des applications à la théorie des séries, Rivista di matematica 7: 115–148.
1901, On the Notion of Order, Mind (n.s.) 10: 35–51.
1902, (with Alfred North Whitehead), On Cardinal Numbers, American Journal of Mathematics 24: 367–384.
1948, BBC Reith Lectures: Authority and the Individual A series of six radio lectures broadcast on the BBC Home Service in December 1948.

Secondary sources
John Newsome Crossley. A Note on Cantor's Theorem and Russell's Paradox, Australian Journal of Philosophy 51, 1973, 70–71.
Ivor Grattan-Guinness. The Search for Mathematical Roots 1870–1940. Princeton: Princeton University Press, 2000.
Alan Ryan. Bertrand Russell: A Political Life, New York: Oxford University Press, 1981.

Further reading
 Books about Russell's philosophy
Alfred Julius Ayer. Russell, London: Fontana, 1972. . A lucid summary exposition of Russell's thought.
Elizabeth Ramsden Eames. Bertrand Russell's Theory of Knowledge, London: George Allen and Unwin, 1969. . A clear description of Russell's philosophical development.
Celia Green. The Lost Cause: Causation and the Mind-Body Problem, Oxford: Oxford Forum, 2003.  Contains a sympathetic analysis of Russell's views on causality.
A. C. Grayling. Russell: A Very Short Introduction, Oxford University Press, 2002.
Nicholas Griffin. Russell's Idealist Apprenticeship, Oxford: Oxford University Press, 1991.
A. D. Irvine, ed. Bertrand Russell: Critical Assessments, 4 volumes, London: Routledge, 1999. Consists of essays on Russell's work by many distinguished philosophers.
Michael K. Potter. Bertrand Russell's Ethics, Bristol: Thoemmes Continuum, 2006. A clear and accessible explanation of Russell's moral philosophy.
P. A. Schilpp, ed. The Philosophy of Bertrand Russell, Evanston and Chicago: Northwestern University, 1944.
John Slater. Bertrand Russell, Bristol: Thoemmes Press, 1994.

 Biographical books
A. J. Ayer. Bertrand Russell, New York: Viking Press, 1972, reprint ed. London: University of Chicago Press, 1988, 
Andrew Brink. Bertrand Russell: A Psychobiography of a Moralist, Atlantic Highlands, NJ: Humanities Press International, Inc., 1989, 
Ronald W. Clark. The Life of Bertrand Russell, London: Jonathan Cape, 1975, 
Ronald W. Clark. Bertrand Russell and His World, London: Thames & Hudson, 1981, 
Rupert Crawshay-Williams. Russell Remembered, London: Oxford University Press, 1970. Written by a close friend of Russell's
John Lewis. Bertrand Russell: Philosopher and Humanist, London: Lawerence & Wishart, 1968
Ray Monk. Bertrand Russell: Mathematics: Dreams and Nightmares, London: Phoenix, 1997, 
Ray Monk. Bertrand Russell: The Spirit of Solitude, 1872–1920 Vol. I, New York: Routledge, 1997, 
Ray Monk. Bertrand Russell: The Ghost of Madness, 1921–1970 Vol. II, New York: Routledge, 2001, 
Caroline Moorehead. Bertrand Russell: A Life, New York: Viking, 1993, 
George Santayana. "Bertrand Russell", in Selected Writings of George Santayana, Norman Henfrey (ed.), Cambridge: Cambridge University Press, I, 1968, pp. 326–329
Peter Stone et al. Bertrand Russell's Life and Legacy. Wilmington: Vernon Press, 2017.
Katharine Tait. My Father Bertrand Russell, New York: Thoemmes Press, 1975
Alan Wood. Bertrand Russell: The Passionate Sceptic, London: George Allen & Unwin, 1957.

External links

Bertrand Russell – media on YouTube
The Bertrand Russell Archives at McMaster University
The Bertrand Russell Society

BBC Face to Face interview with Bertrand Russell and John Freeman, broadcast 4 March 1959
 including the Nobel Lecture, 11 December 1950 "What Desires Are Politically Important?"
Interview with Ray Monk at Today, 18 May 2022 (from 2:58:35)

 
1872 births
1970 deaths
19th-century atheists
19th-century English mathematicians
19th-century English philosophers
19th-century essayists
20th-century atheists
20th-century English mathematicians
20th-century English philosophers
20th-century essayists
Academics of the London School of Economics
Alumni of Trinity College, Cambridge
Analytic philosophers
Anti–Vietnam War activists
Aristotelian philosophers
Atheist philosophers
British anti–nuclear weapons activists
British anti–World War I activists
British atheism activists
British ethicists
Campaign for Nuclear Disarmament activists
British consciousness researchers and theorists
Consequentialists
Critics of Christianity
Critics of religions
Critics of the Catholic Church
Critics of work and the work ethic
De Morgan Medallists
Deaths from influenza
Earls Russell
Empiricists
English agnostics
English anti-fascists
English anti–nuclear weapons activists
English atheist writers
English essayists
English historians of philosophy
English humanists
English logicians
English male non-fiction writers
English Nobel laureates
English pacifists
English people of Scottish descent
English people of Welsh descent
English political commentators
English political philosophers
English political writers
English prisoners and detainees
English sceptics
English social commentators
English socialists
Epistemologists
European democratic socialists
Fellows of the Royal Society
Fellows of Trinity College, Cambridge
Free love advocates
Free speech activists
Freethought writers
Georgists
Honorary Fellows of the British Academy
Infectious disease deaths in Wales
Intellectual historians
Jerusalem Prize recipients
Kalinga Prize recipients
English LGBT rights activists
Liberal socialism
Linguistic turn
Logicians
Mathematical logicians
Members of the Order of Merit
Metaphilosophers
Metaphysicians
Metaphysics writers
Nobel laureates in Literature
Nonviolence advocates
Ontologists
People from Harting
People from Monmouthshire
Philosophers of culture
Philosophers of economics
Philosophers of education
Philosophers of history
Philosophers of language
Philosophers of law
Philosophers of literature
Philosophers of logic
Philosophers of love
Philosophers of mathematics
Philosophers of mind
Philosophers of religion
Philosophers of science
Philosophers of sexuality
Philosophers of social science
Philosophers of technology
Political philosophers
Presidents of the Aristotelian Society
Residents of Pembroke Lodge, Richmond Park
Rhetoric theorists
Bertrand Russell
Secular humanists
Set theorists
The Nation (U.S. magazine) people
Theorists on Western civilization
Universal basic income writers
University of California, Los Angeles faculty
University of Chicago faculty
Utilitarians
Writers about activism and social change
Writers about communism
Writers about globalization
Writers about religion and science
Writers about the Soviet Union